Thapa is a common Nepali surname. This list provides links to biographies of people who share this common surname.

Notable people

A

 Amar Bahadur Thapa, Nepalese politician
 Amar Singh Thapa, Nepalese Badakaji General and Supreme Commander of Western front in Anglo-Nepalese War
 Amar Singh Thapa (born 1759), Nepalese Sanukaji General and Governor of Palpa 
 Anirudh Thapa, Indian professional footballer 
 Arjun Bahadur Thapa, former SAARC Secretary General
 Arpan Thapa, Nepalese director and actor
 Arun Thapa, Nepali singer

B

 Balbir Singh Thapa, known as Yogi Naraharinath, Nepalese historian
 Ben Thapa, British opera singer
 Bhakti Thapa, Sardar, Nepalese commander of Deuthal in Anglo-Nepalese War
Bhaskar Thapa, Nepalese civil engineer and lead designer of Caldecott Tunnel Fourth Bore
 Bhimsen Thapa Mukhtiyar, former Nepalese prime minister
 Bhekh Bahadur Thapa, Nepalese central banker and former cabinet minister
 Bhola Thapa, Nepali educationist, researcher, author and the Vice Chancellor of Kathmandu University
 Bipana Thapa, Nepalese actress
 Bir Bhadra Thapa, Nepalese commander during the country's unification
 Biraj Thapa Magar, Kaji of Gorkha

D
 Dekendra Thapa, Nepali journalist
Devu Thapa, Nepalese judoka
 Major Dhan Singh Thapa, Paramvir Chakra (PVC)
 Dharmapaal Barsingh Thapa, former Chief of Army Staff of the Nepal Army
 Dharmaraj Thapa, titled Jana Kavi Keshari, Nepali poet and songwriter
Durlav Kumar Thapa, former Nepalese Inspector General of Police

G

 Gagan Kumar Thapa, Nepalese politician and current Minister of Health
 Gajraj Singh Thapa, Nepalese governor of the Ilam district and tea plantation entrepreneur 
Ganesh Thapa, former president of the All Nepal Football Association
Geetanjali Thapa, Indian actress

J
 Jharana Thapa, Nepalese actress.

K
 Kamal Thapa, Current Deputy Prime Minister, President of Rastriya Prajatantra Party Nepal, Monarchist and Hinduism centered Leader
Kamal Thapa (footballer), Indian footballer
Karna Bahadur Thapa, Former Minister of Nepal
Khagendra Thapa Magar, former shortest man recordholder
 Kulbir Thapa; 1st Nepali Victoria Cross holder

L
 Lakhan Thapa Magar, Nepalese revolutionary 
 Lalbahadur Thapa, Victoria Cross holder
Lalit Thapa, Indian footballer
Leeladhwaj Thapa, Nepalese author and recipient of the Madan Puraskar
Lily Thapa, Nepalese entrepreneur

M
Mamata Thapa, Nepalese cricketer
 Manjushree Thapa, Nepalese-Canadian, English-language author
 Mathabar Singh Thapa, former Prime Minister of Nepal

N
Nain Singh Thapa, Nepalese Kaji and General 
Nam Singh Thapa, Nepalese boxer
Namrata Thapa, Indian actress 
Neri Thapa, Nepalese cricketer
 Netrabahadur Thapa, Nepalese soldier and Victoria Cross recipient

P
 Parvati Thapa (born 1970), Nepalese sports shooter 
Purna Chandra Thapa, Nepalese general
 Pyar Jung Thapa, Former Chief of Army Staff of Nepal Army

Q
 Queen Tripurasundari of Nepal; Queen Consort of King Rana Bahadur Shah

R
Rabi Thapa, Nepalese writer
 Ram Thapa, Nepalese singer, musician
Ram Pratap Thapa, Honorary Consul General in Cologne
 Ranabir Singh Thapa, Commander of Makwanpur Axis at Anglo-Nepalese War
Ranadhoj Thapa, Former Deputy Prime Minister of Nepal
 Ranajor Singh Thapa, Commander of Nahan Axis at Anglo-Nepalese War
 Rekha Thapa, Nepalese actress
Ritesh Thapa, Nepalese footballer
Rom Bahadur Thapa, former Nepalese Inspector General of Police
Roshan Thapa, Nepalese songwriter

S

 Sagar Thapa, Nepalese footballer
 Shailesh Thapa Chhetri, 28th and current Inspector General of Nepal Police
 Sharmila Thapa, Nepal-born Indian television host and actress
 Sher Bahadur Thapa, Nepalese soldier and recipient of the Victoria Cross
 Sher Jung Thapa, Mahavir Chakra (MVC)
 Shiva Thapa, Indian boxer
 Shyam Thapa, Indian footballer
 Shyam Bhakta Thapa, Ex-Nepal Police Chief
 Suhana Thapa, Nepalese actress
 Sunil Bahadur Thapa, Nepali politician
 Sunil Thapa, Nepalese actor
 Surya Bahadur Thapa, former Prime Minister of Nepal

T
 Tejshree Thapa, Nepali human rights lawyer

U
 Ujir Singh Thapa, Nepalese commander in the Anglo-Nepalese War
Ujwal Thapa, President of Bibeksheel Nepali

Y
Yagya Bahadur Thapa, Nepalese soldier

Fictional 
Jemadar Thapa, a guest cast played by Ernie Reyes Jr. in drama NCIS: Los Angeles (season 5)
Thapa, a character from the video game Kane & Lynch: Dead Men

References 

Lists of people by surname
Nepali-language surnames